Bennett U. Strong (April 28, 1819February 1, 1906) was an American businessman, Republican politician, and the first settler at Spring Green, Wisconsin.  He served two years in the Wisconsin State Senate, representing Sauk County.

Biography
Bennett Strong was born in Woodbury, Connecticut, in 1819.  He was raised and educated there and came to Wisconsin in 1853, settling at Janesville.  In 1857, he relocated to the town of Spring Green in Sauk County, where he was the first settler at what would become the village of Spring Green.  He owned a farm and operated a hotel there, and represented Spring Green for seven years on the Sauk County board of supervisors.  He also served as justice of the peace.

In 1869, he was elected on the Republican Party ticket to the Wisconsin State Senate, representing all of Sauk County.  In the Legislature, he served on the committees on incorporations, on legislative expenditures, and on military affairs.  He did not run for re-election in 1871.

Later in life, Strong became affiliated with the Prohibition Party, and, in 1890, he was nominated for Wisconsin State Assembly on the Prohibition ticket in Sauk County's 1st Assembly district.  He came in third in the general election, behind Democrat Thomas William English and Republican William F. Conger.

Sometime after 1892, Strong and his wife moved to Los Angeles County, California, where he died in 1906.

Electoral history

Wisconsin Senate (1869)

| colspan="6" style="text-align:center;background-color: #e9e9e9;"| General Election, November 2, 1869

Wisconsin Assembly (1890)

| colspan="6" style="text-align:center;background-color: #e9e9e9;"| General Election, November 4, 1890

References

1819 births
1906 deaths
People from Woodbury, Connecticut
People from Spring Green, Wisconsin
County supervisors in Wisconsin
Republican Party Wisconsin state senators